Hannah Marcina Bronfman (born October 26, 1987) is an American DJ, social media influencer, and entrepreneur from Manhattan. She was a co-founder of Beautified, a now defunct mobile app for finding last-minute beauty services.

Early life and education
Bronfman was born to Edgar Bronfman Jr., former Warner Music Group CEO, the heir of one of the wealthiest and most influential Jewish families in Canada, and an African-American mother, actress Sherry Brewer. She is a member of the Lehman family through her paternal grandmother, Ann Loeb Bronfman.

She graduated from Bard College in December 2010 with a degree in sculpture.

Career
When she was 20, Bronfman invested in the restaurant Hotel Griffou. She was a co-founder with her older brother, entrepreneur and musician Benjamin Bronfman, of Green Owl, an ecologically oriented multimedia company, which she managed.

In 2012, Bronfman co-founded Beautified, a mobile app that allowed users to secure 
last-minute beauty services such as salon, spa, and gym bookings. The app originally covered only New York City, but expanded to Los Angeles and San Francisco in August 2014. Beautified's expansion coincided with an announcement that it had raised $1.2 million in seed funding.

She was featured in the fashion documentary This is My Reality in 2013, and was a featured model at DKNY's Fall 2014 Fashion Show and walked the runway. It was her first appearance on a runway. In 2015, Bronfman became a Clinique ambassador for their 3-Step System as well as a part of their #FaceForward Campaign, an initiative to capture the attention of millennials.

She has published a health and wellness book titled Do What Feels Good, and runs an associated website, HBFIT.com.

Bronfman is an event DJ in New York City.

Filmography
 Grand Street (2014) – Mia
 American Milkshake (2013) – Cheerleader

Personal life
On August 17, 2015, Bronfman became engaged to her long-time boyfriend, fellow DJ Brendan Fallis. They were married in Marrakesh, Morocco, on May 20, 2017, and have homes in Amagansett, New York, and Manhattan. Their first child was born in 2020.

References

Bard College alumni
People from Manhattan
Living people
Female models from New York (state)
American people of Russian-Jewish descent
American people of Jewish descent
African-American female models
American female models
African-American models
African-American businesspeople
21st-century American businesspeople
21st-century American businesswomen
Hannah
Lehman family
African-American Jews
1987 births
Carl M. Loeb family